The 1971 Women's World Cup (Spanish: 1971 Campeonato de Fútbol Femenil) was an association football tournament organised by the Federation of Independent European Female Football (FIEFF) in Mexico in August–September 1971. Held in Mexico City and Guadalajara, it featured women's teams from six countries and is the second known tournament to be named as a women's football World Cup after the 1970 edition in Italy. It was twenty years before the first official FIFA women's world cup.

Alongside Mexico, who qualified automatically as hosts, teams  from South America and Europe qualified to the 1971 cup. Denmark were the tournament champions, defending its title by winning the final 3–0 against Mexico, in front of a 110,000 crowd.

Background
A women's football international match was played in Scotland in 1881. Later instances included games between British, French and Belgian teams in the 1920s, and a women's European Championship in 1957. During this time, women's football was often stifled or banned by male-dominated football federations in many countries. In Brazil, women's football was effectively illegal from 1941 until 1979.

FIEFF organised a previous Women's World Cup in Italy in 1970, also won by Denmark.

Qualifying
The 1971 tournament featured five different qualifying groups, four in Europe and one in the Americas, where Argentina was the only team included in the initial draw. Italy qualified for the main tournament against England and Austria, but England was later given a place in the finals after all teams from one of the European groups (Spain, Switzerland and West Germany) withdrew from the tournament. 

Similarly, France qualified by defeating the Netherlands after the withdrawal of Czechoslovakia, and Denmark qualified by default after both Belgium and Sweden withdrew. The Americas round was not played and Argentina qualified by default, as neither potential opponents Chile or Costa Rica fulfilled the necessary requirements for the matches to be played.

Some of the qualifiers and finals games were officially recognised – for example, the Italian Football Federation classes all of the 1971 Italy games as full internationals. The match between France and the Netherlands on April 1971 was the first FIFA-recognised women's international match: it was played in Hazebrouck in front of 1,500 spectators. However, players from both teams were unaware of the nature of the match; the French players did not know they had qualified for the tournament until their coach told them after the game, and the Dutch team thought they were playing a friendly match against Stade de Reims (which provided most of the French players) to prepare for the official match in May. A protest was filled by the Dutch organization in charge of the team, to no avail.

Tournament
Tournament sponsors Martini & Rossi paid for each team's travel, accommodation, and kits. Goalposts were painted in pink hoops and stadium staff wore pink clothes, in order to try to appeal to women and families. Ticket prices ranged from 30 pesos (£1.15) to 80 pesos (£3). The tournament mascot was Xochitl, "a young girl in [a] football kit".

The opening match of the finals, Mexico–Argentina (15 August) had a reported attendance of 100,000 at the Azteca Stadium. An estimated 80,000 people attended the Mexico–England group game. The World Cup final, Mexico–Denmark, had an estimated attendance of 110,000, a world record for women's sport. This figure was reported both at the time and subsequently, and surviving footage supports the estimates. The football record at the Azteca Stadium was three years earlier, 119,853 at the men's Mexico–Brazil match in July 1968.

The hosts Mexico qualified for the final after defeating Italy in the semifinals. Two days before the final, the Mexican press noted the players for Mexico were unhappy they had not been receiving economic support for participating in the tournament. The Mexican team threatened to skip the final but gave up their two million peso demand and the game went forward as scheduled.

Denmark won the tournament after beating Mexico 3–0 in the final, featuring a hat trick by 15-year-old Susanne Augustesen. The victorious Danish team were treated to a celebratory reception at Copenhagen Town Hall upon their return from the tournament. However, due to the unofficial nature of the tournament, it is not recognised by the Danish Football Association.

Squads
England's team included 13-year-old Leah Caleb, 14-year-old Gill Sayell, and 15-year-old Chris Lockwood; their captain was 19-year-old Carol Wilson and they were accompanied by referee Pat Dunn as a chaperone and trainer. 15-year-old Susanne Augustesen scored a hat-trick for Denmark as they beat Mexico 3–0 in the final. Augustesen was honoured by the mayor of her hometown, Holbæk.

12 members of England's 14-woman squad reunited in June 2019 for the first time since the tournament.

Group stage

Group 1

Group 2

Knockout stage

Bracket

Semi-finals

Fifth place play-off
A match for fifth place was played between the two teams which did not advance to the semifinals.

Third place play-off

Final

Later tournaments
The tournament was later followed by the series of Mundialito tournaments throughout the 1980s, mostly held  in Italy, and FIFA's Women's Invitation Tournament in China in 1988 before the first FIFA Women's World Cup in China in 1991.

References

Bibliography
 

International women's association football invitational tournaments
International association football competitions hosted by Mexico
Women's World Cup
Women's World Cup
Women's World Cup
August 1971 sports events
September 1971 sports events